A sparkler is a type of hand-held firework that burns slowly while emitting bright, intense colored flames, sparks, and other effects.

Sparklers are particularly popular with children. In the United Kingdom, a sparkler is often used by children at bonfire and fireworks displays on Guy Fawkes Night, the fifth of November, and in the United States on Independence Day. They are called phuljhadi in Hindi and are especially popular during the Diwali festival.

Composition 
Sparklers are generally formed around a thin non-combustible metallic wire, about 8-12 inches (20-30 cm) long, that has been dipped in a thick batter of slow-burning pyrotechnic composition and allowed to dry. 
The combustible coating contains these components, one or more of each category:
 Metallic fuel, mandatory to make sparks; size of particles influences appearance of the sparks
 Aluminium or magnesium or magnalium, producing white sparks
 Iron, producing orange branching sparks
 Titanium, producing rich white sparks
 Ferrotitanium, for yellow-gold sparkles
 Additional fuel, optional, modifying the burning           speed
 Sulfur
 Charcoal
 Oxidizer, mandatory
 Potassium nitrate
 Barium nitrate
 Strontium nitrate
 Potassium perchlorate, more powerful but potentially explosive
 Ammonium perchlorate
 Optional pyrotechnic colorants, for colored flames
 chlorides and nitrates of metals, e.g. barium, strontium, or copper
 Combustible binder, holding the composition together
 Dextrin
 Nitrocellulose

The colored spot on the top of each rod indicates the color of the sparkles emitted when ignited.

Safety issues
A 2009 report from the National Council on Fireworks Safety indicated that sparklers are responsible for 16 percent of legal firework-related injuries in the United States. The U.S. Consumer Product Safety Commission's statistics from the Fourth of July festivities in 2003 indicate that sparklers were involved in a majority (57%) of fireworks injuries sustained by children under five years of age.

Subsequent reports from the U.S. Consumer Product Safety Commission about "Fireworks-Related Deaths, Emergency Department-Treated Injuries, and Enforcement Activities" indicate:

The devices burn at a high temperature (as hot as 1000°C to 1600°C, or 1800°F to 3000°F), depending on the fuel and oxidizer used, more than sufficient to cause severe skin burns or ignite clothing. Safety experts recommend that adults ensure children who handle sparklers are properly warned, supervised and wearing non-flammable clothing. As with all fireworks, sparklers are also capable of accidentally initiating wildfires. This is especially true in drier areas; in Australia, for instance, sparkler-related bushfire accidents have led to their banning at public outdoor events during summer like Australia Day celebrations.

Sparkler bombs are home-made devices constructed by binding together as many as 300 sparklers with tape, leaving one extended to use as a fuse.  In 2008, three deaths were attributed to the devices, which can be ignited accidentally by heat or friction.  Because they usually contain more than 50 milligrams of the same explosive powder found in firecrackers, they are illegal under U.S. Bureau of Alcohol, Tobacco, Firearms and Explosives (ATF) regulations.

In art and popular culture
An art group, monochrom, was planning to light 10,000 bound sparklers which it described as "symbolic liberation" to reflect that sparklers are generally used in monotheistic traditions. 
A large group from Toronto, Ontario, Canada also held an event displaying 10,000 sparklers to symbolize brightness, intensity, warmth and creativity.
In 1999 the two artists Tobias Kipp and Timo Pitkämö developed a technique of drawing portraits with burning sparklers on paper, which they called pyrografie. Since then the two artists have drawn more than 20,000 pyroportraits.

See also
 Consumer fireworks
 Senko hanabi, Japanese style sparkler.

References 

Types of fireworks
Diwali